Dysschema zeladon is a moth of the family Erebidae first described by Harrison Gray Dyar Jr. in 1913. It is found in Mexico.

References

Moths described in 1913
Dysschema